Juncus compressus is a species of flowering plant in the rush family, Juncaceae. It is native to temperate Eurasia.Juncus compressus is easy to confuse with J. gerardii.

Description 
About 80 cm in height. Rhizomes are short-creeping or densely branching.  There are 1-3 cataphylls, and 1-2 leaves. The leaf blade is flat to slightly channeled, measuring 5–35 cm long and 0.8–2 mm wide. Inflorescences consist of 5-60 flowers. Flowers have six stamens, with filaments measuring 0.5-0.7 mm and anthers 0.6–1 mm. Seed capsules are brown.

Habitat 
Juncus compressus prefers calcareous wetlands and is often associated with disturbed habitats, such as ditches, roadsides, railroads, and canal banks.

Invasive species 
The plant is considered an invasive species in the United States of America.

References

compressus
Flora of Europe
Flora of Asia